The 1904 United States presidential election in Virginia took place on November 8, 1904, as part of the 1904 United States presidential election. Voters chose 12 representatives, or electors to the Electoral College, who voted for president and vice president.

Virginia voted for the Democratic candidate, Chief Judge of the New York Court of Appeals Alton B. Parker over the Republican candidate, incumbent President Theodore Roosevelt. Parker won the state by a margin of 24.90%.

Results

Results by county

References

Virginia
1904
1904 Virginia elections